Pseudodictamnus hirsutus is a species of plant in the family Lamiaceae. It is native to the western Mediterranean region, mostly abundant in Spain and Portugal.  It is also native to North Africa.

References

Flora of Spain
Flora of Portugal
Flora of North Africa
Plants described in 1834
Flora of the Mediterranean Basin
Lamiaceae